Fok On Garden is a Home Ownership Scheme and Private Sector Participation Scheme court built on reclaimed land in Ma On Shan, New Territories, Hong Kong near The Waterside, MOSTown and MTR Ma On Shan station. It has a total of two blocks built in 1992.

Houses

Politics
Fok On Garden is located in Ma On Shan Town Centre constituency of the Sha Tin District Council. It is currently represented by Johnny Chung Lai-him, who was elected in the 2019 elections.

See also

Public housing estates in Ma On Shan

References

Ma On Shan
Home Ownership Scheme
Private Sector Participation Scheme
Residential buildings completed in 1992
1992 establishments in Hong Kong